Ross Greenwood may refer to:

 Ross Greenwood (footballer) (born 1985), English footballer
 Ross Greenwood (journalist) (born 1959), Australian journalist